The seventh and final season of the American post-apocalyptic science fiction drama The 100 premiered on May 20, 2020, on The CW, for the 2019–20 United States network television schedule. The series, developed by Jason Rothenberg, is based on the novel series of the same name by Kass Morgan, and follows a group of post-apocalyptic survivors, chiefly a group of criminal adolescents, including Clarke Griffin (Eliza Taylor), Bellamy Blake (Bob Morley), Octavia Blake (Marie Avgeropoulos), Raven Reyes (Lindsey Morgan), and John Murphy (Richard Harmon). They are among the first people from a space habitat, the Ark, to return to Earth after a devastating nuclear apocalypse. After airing sixteen episodes, the season concluded on September 30, 2020.

Cast and characters

Main

 Eliza Taylor as Clarke Griffin
 Bob Morley as Bellamy Blake
 Marie Avgeropoulos as Octavia Blake
 Lindsey Morgan as Raven Reyes
 Richard Harmon as John Murphy
 Tasya Teles as Echo / Ash
 Shannon Kook as Jordan Green
 JR Bourne as Russell Lightbourne / Malachi / Sheidheda
 Chuku Modu as Gabriel Santiago
 Shelby Flannery as Hope Diyoza

Recurring

 Sachin Sahel as Eric Jackson
 Jarod Joseph as Nathan Miller
 Adina Porter as Indra
 Luc Roderique as Penn
 Luisa D'Oliveira as Emori
 Jessica Harmon as Niylah
 Tati Gabrielle as Gaia
 John Pyper-Ferguson as Bill Cadogan
 Lola Flanery as Madi Griffin
 Ivana Miličević as Charmaine Diyoza
 Karen Holness as Blythe Ann Workman
 Dean Marshall as Jae Workman
 Lee Majdoub as Nelson
 Tom Stevens as Trey
 Alaina Huffman as Nikki
 Jason Diaz as Levitt
 Neal McDonough as Anders
 Jonathan Scarfe as Doucette

Guest

 Paige Turco as Abby Griffin / the Judge
 Alycia Debnam-Carey as Lexa / the Judge
 Erica Cerra as Becca Franko
 Sara Thompson as Josephine Lightbourne I 
 Dakota Daulby as Malachi/Sheidheda
 Camden Filtness as James Crockett

Episodes
The number in the "No. overall" column refers to the episode's number within the overall series, whereas the number in the "No. in season" column refers to the episode's number within this particular season. Numerous episodes are named after similarly named episodes from the original series. "Production code" refers to the order in which the episodes were produced while "U.S. viewers (millions)" refers to the number of viewers in the U.S. in millions who watched the episode as it was aired.

Production

On April 24, 2019, The CW renewed The 100 for a seventh season ahead of its sixth-season premiere. On August 4, 2019, it was announced by Mark Pedowitz and series developer Jason Rothenberg that the new season would be the show's last, and that it would contain sixteen episodes, to finish the series with a grand total of 100 episodes. Various cast members who had recurring roles in previous seasons of The 100 returned to star in the seventh season, including Sachin Sahel as Eric Jackson, Jarod Joseph as Nathan Miller, and Adina Porter as Indra. On September 19, 2019, Alaina Huffman was cast as Nikki, a character described as being  "a bank robber and spree-killer who is both unpredictable and fierce." Additionally, on September 25, 2019, Chuku Modu was upped to series regular in the role of Gabriel Santiago. In the series finale, Paige Turco and Alycia Debnam-Carey both returned in guest appearances in the roles of Abby Griffin and Lexa, respectively.

Filming for the series finale began in Vancouver on March 4, 2020, during the COVID-19 pandemic, and concluded on March 15.

Release
On March 4, 2020, it was revealed that the last season of The 100 would premiere on The CW on May 20, 2020, and that it would feature a timeslot change for the season moving from Tuesday's to Wednesday's at 8 PM ET.

Reception

Critical response
On review aggregator Rotten Tomatoes, the seventh season of The 100 holds an approval rating of 100% based on 8 reviews, with an average rating of 7.5/10.

From Entertainment Weekly, Dalene Rovenstine opined that, "Overall, I'm not crazy that this very sci-fi show suddenly went supernatural/spiritual at the end. There were certainly rocky spots in this season for sure, just like the series in general. But honestly, I'm just happy that Clarke, Raven, and Octavia finally get to be happy. And I'm thankful for all the seasons we've got to spend with them." Writing for Collider, Haleigh Foutch lauded the show's characters, and their development throughout the season, stating that "Every character is forced to pull their own personal lever of sorts, placed in a position where they have to make a snap survival judgment that puts their values to the test. Some of their choices may surprise you." Linda Maleh, writing for Forbes, gave positive feedback to the season's suspenseful storyline, saying that the series helped her go through the quarantine caused by the COVID-19 pandemic, stating that "There's a new set of mysteries and stakes this season that will keep fans on the edge of their seats [...]." From CBR.com, Sam Stone also praised the series for its cast, and suspenseful story, stating that "The 100's new season hits the ground running—literally—barely giving its characters and, by extension, its audience, the chance to breathe as the stakes are raised once again."

Viewing figures

Home media

References

External links
 Official website
 

The 100 (TV series)
2020 American television seasons